This article lists the people who have been fatally injured in American Championship car racing during testing, practice, qualifying, or races since 1916, categorized into drivers, riding mechanics, and non-participants.  The lists show "IndyCar" or "Champ Car" fatalities that occurred in events making up the National Championship, which has been held by the following sanctioning bodies:

American Automobile Association (1916, 1920–1941, 1946–1955)
United States Auto Club (1956–1995)
Championship Auto Racing Teams (1979–2007)
Indy Racing League (since 1996)

The National Championship, which was split from 1979 to 2007, has featured regular races, non-points paying (non-championship) rounds, competitions sanctioned by entities that did not stage the National Championship in the same year (such as the Automobile Club of America), and the AAA Big car meetings held in the 1946 season.

The most recent driver to be fatally injured in an IndyCar Series event was Justin Wilson at the 2015 ABC Supply 500.

Driver fatalities

Breakdown

Fatalities among riding mechanics 
✝ indicates that the driver was killed in the same collision.

Fatalities among non-participants 
This section includes anyone killed during an event or who suffered fatal injuries during an event, who was not in a race car during the fatal incident.

See also 
List of fatalities at the Indianapolis Motor Speedway

Notes

References

External links 
ChampCarStats.com
Motorsport Memorial
OldRacingCars.com

Fatalities
IndyCar